Amram ben Diwan (Hebrew: : died 1782, Ouazzane, Morocco) was a venerated 18th-century rabbi whose tomb has become the site of an annual pilgrimage.

Born in Jerusalem, he soon moved to Hebron in 1743 and was sent to Morocco in order to collect donations for the Holy land from the Jewish community there. He took residence in Ouazzane, where he taught the Talmud and had many disciples. After 10 years spent in Morocco, Rabbi Amram returned to Hebron and, according to legend, entered the Cave of the Patriarchs disguised as a Muslim because it was forbidden for Jews at the time. Someone recognized him and reported him to the Ottoman Pasha, who ordered his arrest. He was compelled to flee and returned to Morocco, where he was welcomed by the Jewish community of Fes. He is credited with many healing miracles and had at least one son, Rabbi Hayyim ben Diwan. While touring Morocco with his son, he fell ill and died in Ouazzane in 1782.

His burial place in Ouazzane became a pilgrimage site and is regularly visited, particularly by people who invoke God to heal their illness in his merit.

References

People from Jerusalem
18th-century Moroccan rabbis
People from Hebron
18th-century rabbis from the Ottoman Empire
1782 deaths
Year of birth missing